Radoslav Hecl (born October 11, 1974) is a Slovak former ice hockey defenceman. He played 14 games in the National Hockey League with the Buffalo Sabres during the 2002–03 season, though the rest of his career, which lasted from 1992 to 2008, was mainly spent in the Slovak Extraliga. Internationally Hecl played for the Slovak national team at three World Championships, winning gold in 2002.

Playing career

After several years in the Slovak Extraliga, Hecl was drafted in the seventh round, 208th overall, by the Buffalo Sabres in the 2002 NHL Entry Draft. Hecl appeared in fourteen National Hockey League games in the 2002–03 season, recording no points, and spent the rest of the season with the Sabres' American Hockey League affiliate, the Rochester Americans.  Hecl returned to his native Slovakia and played two seasons in the Slovak Extraliga with HC Slovan Bratislava before joining the EIHL with the  Manchester Phoenix in the 2006–07 season.  He moved on to Sport Ghiaccio Pontebba in Serie A in the 2007–08 season before retiring.

Career statistics

Regular season and playoffs

International

External links
 

1974 births
Living people
Buffalo Sabres draft picks
Buffalo Sabres players
HC '05 Banská Bystrica players
HC Slovan Bratislava players
HK Dukla Trenčín players
HK Nitra players
Manchester Phoenix players
People from Partizánske
Sportspeople from the Trenčín Region
Rochester Americans players
SG Pontebba players
Slovak ice hockey defencemen
Czechoslovak ice hockey defencemen
Expatriate ice hockey players in Italy
Expatriate ice hockey players in England
Slovak expatriate ice hockey players in the United States
Slovak expatriate sportspeople in England
Slovak expatriate sportspeople in Italy